Woman on the Run is a 1950 American crime film noir directed by Norman Foster and starring Ann Sheridan and Dennis O'Keefe. The film was based on the April 1948 short story "Man on the Run" by Sylvia Tate and filmed on location in San Francisco.

The film, which lies in the public domain, was restored and preserved by the UCLA Film & Television Archive.

Plot
Frank Johnson is an unsuccessful painter who is out walking his dog one night when a car stops nearby. Unbeknown to Frank, the passenger in the car, a middle-aged man with an Irish accent, is trying to blackmail the driver. The passenger is about to testify before the grand jury against a criminal named Smiley Freeman. The passenger promises that he will not divulge the driver's ties to Freeman in return for a cash payment. The passenger does all the talking, addressing the driver, whose face is not shown, as "Danny Boy". Frank hears a shot as the would-be blackmailer is pushed out the passenger door. The stricken man begs for his life before the driver finishes him off with a second shot. The killer then sees Frank hiding in the shadows and takes two shots at him before driving away.

The police identify the victim as Joe Gordon.  They tell Frank that Gordon was about to give evidence against Freeman. Because Frank clearly saw the shooter's face, Police Inspector Ferris wants to place him in protective custody. Frank has second thoughts and slips away while the police are otherwise occupied. Ferris sends for Frank's wife, Eleanor, to see if she can help him find Frank. When she arrives, the police are taken aback by her seeming lack of concern for her husband. Her flippant remarks indicate an unhappy marriage. It's "just like him, always running away," she tells Ferris. "Running away from what?" Ferris asks. "From everything," she replies. The police stake out her building in case Frank returns home.

Eleanor later tries to sneak out of her building without being spotted by the police and encounters reporter Danny Legget. He offers his help and $1000 for an exclusive story. They go to a club that Frank frequents. Sam, a waiter friend of Frank's, furtively passes a written message to Eleanor. But Legget reads the message too without Eleanor noticing.  The message, from Frank, is that he will send her a letter addressed to his co-worker Maibus.
 
When Eleanor returns to her apartment, Ferris is waiting for her.  He informs her that Dr. Hohler, Frank's doctor, has told him that Frank is taking medicine for a bad heart, a fact Frank has kept from Eleanor. Eleanor goes to Dr. Hohler who confirms that Frank's heart condition could be fatal. He gives Eleanor some ampules of Frank's medicine.

Eleanor then goes to the department store where Frank works as a window designer to get the letter he sent to Maibus. But Maibus doesn't have the letter and the mail clerk tells him there was no letter. Legget has managed to get the letter by bribing the mail clerk before Eleanor had arrived. Legget reads it but the letter doesn't tell him where to find Frank. He now has to show the letter to Eleanor, who is the only person in a position to guess where Frank is staying from the hints Frank gives in the letter, but Eleanor can't figure out what Frank is trying to tell her. They speak to Sam again at the club. One of the dancers, Suzie, mentions to Legget that Frank made a sketch that resembles Legget, but Eleanor doesn't hear her conversation with him. Suzie tells Legget that she will keep the sketch for the time being. Legget and Eleanor cross the street to a bar to make further inquiries. Legget leaves Eleanor on the pretense of making a phone call but exits the bar unobserved and returns to the club. He later slips back into the bar, tears up a penciled likeness of himself, and rejoins Eleanor as police cars and an ambulance arrive at the club. Suzie has apparently fallen from the building to her death.

During her search for Frank, Eleanor learns things that she never knew about him, especially that everyone who knows Frank likes and admires him. They all believe that she must be a wonderful person if Frank married her. She tells Legget that she now realizes how much Frank really loves her.

Eleanor finally deduces from the clues in Frank's letter that he is waiting for her on the beach near an amusement park. Eleanor arrives there at night accompanied by the persistent Legget, who has by this time thoroughly insinuated himself into her confidence. Ferris locates the taxi that Legget and Eleanor took to the amusement park and goes after them. Ferris also receives a phone call from Sam, who tells him that the only thing missing from Suzie's possessions is Frank's drawing of Legget. In the meantime, Eleanor finds Frank and they embrace. She then leaves to look for Legget. She and Legget spot Ferris and get on a roller coaster to avoid being spotted in turn. Legget has Eleanor stay on the roller coaster while he goes to meet Frank. But Legget has inadvertently let it slip that the killer had shot at Frank. Eleanor suddenly realizes that the only other person who could know this fact is the gunman himself -- "Danny Boy" Legget.  While she is trapped on the ride, Legget tries to put Frank under enough stress to induce a heart attack. The two struggle. Shots ring out. Eleanor runs to the scene to discover that Ferris has shot Legget. For the second time, she and Frank embrace.

Cast
 Ann Sheridan as Eleanor Johnson
 Dennis O'Keefe as Daniel Legget
 Robert Keith as Inspector Martin Ferris
 John Qualen as Maibus
 Frank Jenks as Detective Shaw 
 Ross Elliott as Frank Johnson
 Jane Liddell as Messenger Girl
 Joan Shawlee as Tipsy Blonde in Bar (as Joan Fulton)
 J. Farrell MacDonald as Sea Captain
 Steven Geray as Dr. Hohler
 Victor Sen Yung as Sam
 Reiko Sato as Suzie (as Rako Sato)
 Syd Saylor as Sullivan 
 Milton Kibbee as man yelling from apartment house (uncredited)
 Tom Dillon as Joe Gordon (as Thomas P. Dillon)

Production
Production on the film was announced in trade publications in January 1950, initially with the working title Man on the Run. As part of the casting process, actor J. Farrell MacDonald was then "borrowed" from 20th Century Fox for the supporting role of the sea captain before filming began on 20 March. The film was shot on location in San Francisco as well as at Ocean Park Pier in Santa Monica for the amusement park and roller coaster scenes.

Ross Hunter worked as dialogue director on the film. He later produced some movies starring Sheridan at Universal helping launch Hunter's producing career.

Reception
In 1950, the critic Bosley Crowther of The New York Times gave the film a generally positive review:

In a more current assessment of the drama, reviewer Farran Smith Nehme in 2016 praised Sheridan's performance in Film Comment. Also, according to film historian Philippa Gates, Woman on the Run is one of very few noir films foregrounding a heroine's quest, and especially one where "the heroine's quest is not necessarily complicated by [heterosexual romance ..., in fact] the love interests are absent for the majority of the story".

See also
 Public domain film
 List of American films of 1950
 List of films in the public domain in the United States

References

External links
 
 
 
 
 
 

1950 films
1950 crime films
American black-and-white films
American crime films
1950s English-language films
Film noir
Films based on short fiction
Films directed by Norman Foster
Films scored by Emil Newman
Films set in San Francisco
Films shot in San Francisco
Universal Pictures films
Films scored by Arthur Lange
1950s American films